Hardware (Curtis Metcalf) is a fictional superhero published by DC Comics. An original character from DC's Milestone Comics imprint, he first appeared in Hardware #1 (February 1993), and was created by Dwayne McDuffie and Denys Cowan.

Publication history
Hardware was the first of Milestone's titles to be published, and (along with Blood Syndicate, Icon, and Static) was one of the company's flagship titles.

Fictional character biography

Milestone Universe
Curtis "Curt" Metcalf is a genius inventor who, in his Hardware identity, uses a variety of high-tech gadgets to fight organised crime. A central irony of the series (of which Metcalf is fully aware) is that Metcalf's employer, respected businessman Edwin Alva—who provides the resources Metcalf uses to create Hardware's hardware—is secretly the crime boss whom Hardware is trying to bring down.

Metcalf was a working class child prodigy who was discovered aged 12–13 by a big-time businessman, Edwin Alva Sr., who with the blessing of Curt's parents, enrolled Curt in A Better Chance, "a program intended to get minority students into elite prep schools". Curt proved to be much smarter than all the other prep school students, graduating at age 14, and earning his first college degree at age 15. Alva paid for Metcalf's whole college tuition up to six additional college degrees, in exchange for Metcalf coming to work, after graduation, in Alva Industries' "Inspiration Factory" program, with his "own lab, entirely too big a salary, and mandate to indulge [his] curiosity by investigating whatever struck [his] fancy"; Metcalf's inventions made Edwin Alva Sr. many millions of dollars.

After a few years, and wanting a share of profits earned by his inventions, Metcalf asked Alva for a "royalty point or two". Alva's answer was: "Curtis let us dispense with any misconceptions you may be labouring under. You are not family. You are an employee. Neither are you heir apparent. You are a cog in the machine. My machine. You are not respected, Curtis. You are merely useful. You may go now". Metcalf's first thought was to quit, but his contract forbade him from working for any competitors: "If [he wanted] to work in [his] field [of expertise], [he] had to do it for Alva".

Metcalf thought that with some advanced hacking, he could find something on Alva to use as leverage, but found that almost everything about Alva was "Stone Cold Crooked": Metcalf: "It took me weeks to put it all together, but the evidence was clear and incontrovertible. Edwin Alva Sr. is at the center of an incredibly complex web of corruption. My benefactor and role model, the economic savior and humanitarian pillar of the city of Dakota, has connections to organized crime. He launders tens of millions of dollars in drug money, he has most of the city and state government in his pocket, he illegally manufactures weapons and sells them to foreign governments".

Metcalf decided to stop Alva first by anonymously sending "copies of evidence to the FBI, the U.S. Securities and Exchange Commission (SEC), the state and local police, several newspapers and, just for fun, Hard Copy and A Current Affair". Then he waited a while for the fireworks, but learned that Alva was too big, beyond the reach of the law. But Metcalf decided that maybe Alva wasn't beyond his own reach; so with Alva's own equipment and resources, Curt created "Hardware - the High Tech Creature of the Night, who's been checkmating Alva's illegal operations for the last ten months is, in a way, Alva's own creation".

So just about every night Metcalf dons a selection of his many high tech gadgets (which he hides away in an abandoned basement/bomb shelter connected to his private lab) to track down and destroy all of Alva's illegal business operations and Alva's factories where weapons of war are manufactured: "This used to be a bomb shelter. Now it's where I keep all the stuff I've scammed from Alva. He's turned the city upside down looking for Hardware. I live in his basement".

Hardware works with many other superheroes over his career, such as Blood Syndicate and Icon. He even teams up with a few that he considers fictional, such as Steel and Superman. In one instance, he assists in the evacuation of Utopia Park, a newly built theme park, which is being destroyed by riots.

DC Universe
Following the death of Darkseid (as chronicled in Final Crisis), the space-time continuum was torn asunder, threatening the existence of both the Dakotaverse and the mainstream DC universe. The being known as Dharma was able to use energies that he harnessed from Rift (upon that being's defeat in Worlds Collide) to merge the two universes, creating an entirely new continuity. Only Dharma, Icon, and Superman are aware that Dakota and its inhabitants ever existed in a parallel universe.

In the revised continuity, Hardware and the other Milestone characters have apparently always existed in the DC Universe. The first non-Dakota heroes he encounters are the Justice League of America, whom he meets while aiding the Shadow Cabinet in kidnapping Kimiyo Hoshi, and stealing the remains of Arthur Light.

During the mission, he defeats Red Arrow, and expresses an attraction to Vixen. After attempting to flee the Justice League Satellite with Light's shrunken corpse, Hardware is surprised and beaten into unconsciousness by Hawkman. It is later revealed that, during Hoshi's brief period of captivity, Hardware gave her a new costume which can collect and assimilate light energy. Due to this new function on her suit, Hoshi is able to regain her powers and Dr. Light's identity after Curtis gives her Arthur's remains.

Soon after, Hardware teamed up with Blue Beetle in order to stop SYSTEM smugglers from selling stolen Alva Industries technology to the notorious Intergang. The pair of heroes were ambushed by one of the smugglers wearing advanced SYSTEMatic powered armor designed by the new Gizmo, an ally of SYSTEM. Hardware begrudgingly realized he needed the Beetle's help to defeat the smugglers and capture the stolen weaponry. Despite his initial dislike of Blue Beetle, Hardware and the young hero part on friendly terms after successfully rounding up the smugglers.

Hardware later appears in the aftermath of the JLA's dissolution following Final Crisis. After raiding the hideout of Dakota crime lord Holocaust, he is forced into helping the remaining Justice League members track down Dr. Light, who went missing while chasing Shadow Thief and Starbreaker. Using a tracer installed in her costume, Hardware is able to track Dr. Light and the others to the Shadow Cabinet's HQ, Shadowspire. There, Hardware and the League confront Starbreaker, who has transformed into a massive being made of energy after consuming Dharma's blood.

During the battle, Hardware is successfully able to persuade young hero Firestorm from killing Shadow Thief, a feat that impresses Vixen. Thanks to the energy collectors in Dr. Light's suit and some assistance from John Stewart of the Green Lantern Corps, the group is able to defeat Starbreaker once and for all.

Another new beginning
Following the events of Flashpoint, Hardware becomes a mentor of sorts to Static, who has now left Dakota and moved to New York City. He provides the youth with a modified flying disk and a new costume which possesses a holographic interface that allows them to communicate over vast distances. He also gets Static a job as an intern at the New York branch of STAR Labs.

Supporting characters

Barraki Young - Curtis' girlfriend.
Don "Jolly Jock" Cornelius - a mob leader, by faking the death of Hardware at the hands of Harm, Harm was left in control of Cornelius' mob sector in Dakota.
Deacon "Phreaky Deak" Stuart - a hardcore computer hacker, a friend of Curtis Metcalf's; Deacon "Phreaky Deak" Stuart was first introduced in issue #5.
Deathwish (Wilton Johnson) - a psychotic vigilante obsessed with sex related crimes. He was the victim of a brutal family raping of which only he survived. Deathwish was first introduced in issue #5 going up against Hardware; Deathwish appeared in Hardware six times and got his own 4-issue spin-off mini-series in December 1994. It was notable for its use of a pre-operative transsexual protagonist and the exclamation to close the third issue: "Screw art! Let's dance!" (the comic was penned by Maddie Blaustein).
Edwin Alva, Sr. - owner of Alva Industries and is the leader of the Indigo Cell in the S.Y.S.T.E.M. organization.
Harm (Nick Pugliese) - a super-human mob enforcer who is actually an undercover cop, introduced in issue #10.
Reprise - a super-human hitman with the power to make duplicates of himself.
Technique (Tiffany Evans) - a phenom, introduced in issue #9, who under Alva's orders became Technique to stop Hardware; in the resulting battle Technique beats up on Hardware badly, teaching him a lesson in humility.
Transit - a teleporting superhuman villain.

Skills and abilities
Curtis Metcalf possesses no superhuman powers but has genius level intelligence, and is considered one of the most brilliant scientific minds on the planet. He has created breakthroughs in metallurgy, computer science, nanotechnology, and plasma weapons. Metcalf is also a good hand-to-hand combatant, having been trained by his father in the martial arts.

Equipment

Hardware version 2.0 armor
All of Curtis Metcalf's superhuman abilities derive from a sophisticated suit of armor called Hardware Version 2.0. Perhaps his greatest invention, the suit successfully integrates cutting edge human technology with that of the incredibly advanced alien civilization, the Cooperative.

The Hardware Version 2.0 suit consists of two layers, the basic armor and the external armor, which are described below.

Basic armor
The basic armor is a plasticized metal alloy of Curtis' own design. Using a device called the Shell Forge, Hardware coats his body from head to toe with this material. Once polarized, the shell serves as a skintight, impact-resistant foundation upon which his external armor rests.

Though not bulletproof, the shell is highly bullet resistant and can easily shrug off small caliber gunfire. It also has ablative capabilities that offer protection against low-level energy attacks like electricity and laser beams.

Perhaps the shell's most formidable feature is the programmable polymers integrated into its structure.  These polymers enable the shell to stretch and contract like human muscle, but with considerably greater force. Hence, the shell increases Hardware's natural strength to superhuman levels. Initially, the shell amplified Curtis's strength so that he could lift (press) about 5 tons, but Hardware's battle with the SYSTEMatic Mark III indicates that Curtis has significantly increased the shell's strength augmentation abilities.

The polymers in the shell can also "remember" movements that Curtis programs into them that he can trigger at a later time. For instance, Curtis has programmed complex martial art katas into the polymers that when activated enable him to unleash a high-speed combination of blows. It is due to this feature that Curtis refers to his basic armor as his "smart suit". The drawback to the basic armor is that while wearing it Hardware cannot eat or drink.

External armor
The external systems of Hardware's armor are stored within the nano-robot housing pods in his helmet and shoulder pads. These systems are constructed by nano-robots, microscopic machines that are released via main control systems in the helmet. The external armor is powered by high efficiency batteries called power packs installed in the shoulder pads.

In addition, the helmet includes a Multi-Optics Display Unit (MODU) with wide-range spectral scanning capabilities. This unit enables Hardware to see in wavelengths beyond the visible spectrum including infrared, ultraviolet, and magnetic resonance imaging. The MODU is fully integrated into the tracking and target sub-system that beams a sighting crosshairs onto Hardware's right eye. The target sub-system determines target acquisition by following Hardware's eye movements and then fires on verbal command.

Hardware also uses the tracking system to send hands-free visual commands to his onboard computer, DOBIE. He can spell out these commands by focusing his right eye on letters and short commands from a special menu bar on his tracking monitor. Hardware refers to this system as his visual input mode (also known as "Sutter-Meagher" mode). DOBIE accepts verbal commands as well.

Besides the input systems, his helmet contains a wide-band radio receiver capable of scanning radio traffic, a chronometer, radar (early warning and ground penetrating), a chemical residue analyzer, a digital video player/recorder, and audio, motion, heat, and other sensor instruments.

Housed in the chin guard of Hardware's helmet is his speech synthesizer which gives him his unique and chilling voice. The synthesizer also enables him to reproduce other voices, which is useful for undercover missions. The synthesizer can also translate foreign languages thanks to a built-in Omni-Linguistic Communicator (OmLinC). Reverse engineered by Hardware from the communicator on Icon's crashpod, the OmLinC can analyze and translate any unfamiliar language, human or alien, in seconds. This marks a vast improvement over the original speech synthesizer that could only translate languages stored in DOBIE's databanks.

The aforementioned nano-robots replicate themselves into pre-programmed forms. When released from their pods, the robots begin rapidly constructing Hardware's external armor from the shoulder pads down. Hence, he can don his armor in seconds instead of minutes as was the case with the Version 1.0 suit.  Once empty, the nano-robot pods can be used by Hardware for other storage.

Hardware's external armor is highly resistant to damage. If the armor is breached, the nano-robots composing it are programmed to replicate themselves to repair the damage.

Hardware can also command the nano-robots to assume new configurations, which are stored as templates in DOBIE's databanks. As a result, Hardware's armor can adapt to a wide variety of missions. The "Camouflage Program" template changes the armor's color so Hardware can blend in with his surroundings.  Other templates enable Hardware to safely operate in hostile environments ranging from the ocean floor ("Deep Sea Armor" mode) to the depths of outer space ("Space Environment Armor" mode).

Besides the external armor itself, the nano-robots construct the suit's life support systems including temperature regulators and an internal air supply that activates when the armor is sealed for underwater or deep space travel. The armor is equipped with defense mechanisms to repel anyone who tries to remove it; Hardware has said these defenses can harm even beings as powerful as Blue Beetle. These defenses are made in a high voltage electric charge generated by the armor's surface.

Hardware's latest addition to his armor is jet boots that enable him to fly. Each boot is equipped with miniature jet turbines that gather the surrounding air and then expel it as continuous thrust.  Despite the turbines’ small size, they actually have greater range and fuel efficiency than the bulky jet pack Hardware originally used for flight.

 DOBIE (Digital On-Board Integrated Electronics) - The CPU that controls many of the on-board functions of the Hardware Version 2.0 armor. DOBIE can accept both visual and verbal input.

 Curtis used a new Artificial Intelligence Architecture to design DOBIE’s Operating System. Thus, DOBIE can swiftly process huge amounts of data stored in its databanks or from external sources. By using its Expert System Architecture, DOBIE can also learn as it goes and automatically upgrade its operating system as necessary.

 Originally, Hardware wore DOBIE on the left side of his belt. To better protect DOBIE from physical damage, Curtis now hides it in a compartment in his right gauntlet. In the event of an electromagnetic pulse attack, DOBIE can reboot in minutes.
 Inertia Winder - A device of Cooperative origin that can absorb and store kinetic energy.  Two of these devices are known to exist on Earth; the other is built into Rocket’s belt buckle. Originally, Curtis installed the winder in the bottom of the elevator shaft that Curtis used to an access the underground lab he used as Hardware. This use of the winder became unnecessary when Hardware struck his alliance with Alva.

 Curtis did discover a new use for the inertia winder. While developing the Version 2 armor, he realized that is its weight would be unwieldy. Curtis installed the winder into his own belt buckle. There it offsets the armor's weight as well as much of his own weight. Hence, Hardware can move with unusual dexterity and agility as well move quietly in the bulky suit.

Additional equipment
Curtis has designed various pieces of equipment to enhance the capabilities of his Hardware armor. Many of them are hand-held and can be easily carried on his belt. Larger pieces of equipment are mounted on Hardware's helmet, gauntlets and shoulder pads.

 Quick Pick - A unique lock-picking tool of Curt's design. After its nozzle is inserted into a keyhole, the Pick pours Hardware shell alloy in liquid form into the lock. The Pick then polarizes the alloy into a perfect key in seconds. As a result, no standard lock is safe from this device.
 Sonic Drill – A shoulder-mounted device that creates powerful sonic pulses that can bore through solid rock. By increasing the width of the drill's sonic beam, he can use it as a non-lethal weapon to harmlessly stun opponents.

Other equipment Hardware has used include a forearm-mounted welding tool, tracking devices, a flashlight helmet attachment, a handheld depolarizing device (used to remove his basic armor during emergencies), a handheld scanning device, a wrist-mounted energy analyzer, a special gun that launches miniature eavesdropping devices, a laser cutting tool, a flare gun, wrist-mounted high-intensity flashlights (that double as blinding weapons), and a portable electromagnet capable of lifting weights equal to three armored SYSTEMatics.

Weapons
Curtis Metcalf has designed and employed an extensive arsenal of weapons as Hardware. These weapons range from hand-held armaments to much larger systems that are mounted on his armor's gauntlets and shoulder pads.

Hardware's arsenal has yet to be fully cataloged since he continues to develop weapons to counter new threats. The following is a list of his more notable armaments.

 Omnicannon: Hardware's weapon of choice on most missions; it is rare that he goes into battle without at least one Omnicannon. This forearm mounted cannon fires a blast of compressed air capable of knocking down an opponent at a distance of 12 feet. However, these blasts are primarily intended to propel special cartridges or "shells" of Curtis's design that create various effects.

 At any given time, the Omnicannon is loaded with six shells loaded in a rotating drum the base of his gauntlet (Hardware naturally carries more shells than he could load as needed). The cannon is linked to DOBIE, which provides targeting and tracking. DOBIE can also spin the rotating drum to fire any of the shells currently loaded in any order.

 When the Omnicannon is engaged, a protective shield slides over the back of his wrist. This shield deflects the cannon’s air blast from Hardware’s hand as well as preventing him from accidentally bending his wrist upward while firing the weapon.

 Curtis employs an ever-increasing variety of Omnicannon shells for any possible situation. These include the following: Stun (flash bang grenade): Explosive/Incendiary (a high explosive charge accompanied by a blast of heat); Octanitrocubane (a powerful non-nuclear explosive that can breach enemy fortifications); Tear Gas; Armor Piercing Discarding Sabot (releases a solid sharpened rod of depleted uranium); Nanoacid (releases a swarm of armor-consuming nano-robots); Flame Retardant; HEAP (High Explosive Armor Piercing); Flechette (releases dozens of tiny razor-sharp darts); Anesthetic Flechette (releases darts coated with a fast-acting anesthetic drug); Bolo (releases a nylon-corded steel ball bolo to entangle opponents); Knockout gas (that renders anyone whoever inhales it unconscious for several minutes); Neural Net (releases a cohesive electrical field that painfully disrupts the nervous system of anyone it touches); Complex Polymer (a powerful adhesive that sticks to and immobilizes an opponent); and Cryonic (generates intense cold to place an opponent in suspended animation).

 Plasma Whip: Hardware's whip is perhaps his most versatile weapon, which he can employ offensively, as a grapple for climbing, and as an extended arm for grabbing. The whip is composed of magnetically conducted metal segments shielded with a non-magnetic housing. When a reverse magnetic charge is applied to the collapsed segments, magnetic repulsion instantly extends the whip and keeps it rigid. The whip is 15 feet in length when fully extended. By reversing the polarity of the magnetic charge, the segments collapse to a mere 10 inches due to magnetic attraction. Including the power supply and housing, the retracted whip is slightly less than 18 inches long.

 Under normal circumstances, the power pack in the whip's handle has enough power to extend or retract the weapon for hours. The whip is equipped with a specially-constructed step transformer that when activated by Hardware amplifies the power pack. This causes a small burst of high-energy plasma to be released from the power pack and race to the tip of the whip. Hence, the destructive plasma charge can be delivered to a specific target.
 
 The whip delivers an amount of plasma equal to the mass of matter converted on contact. Put simply, Hardware can employ the whip to disintegrate virtually anything it touches via a matter-to-energy conversion triggered by its plasma charge.

 Hardware's whip can maintain its charge for a maximum of 10 minutes and no more than four minutes at any given time. Any longer than that will completely exhaust the power pack and burn out the mechanism. An energy-ablative coating of Curt's design protects the whip from being consume by the plasma is generates.

 When not in use, the whip is carried in a holster on the right side of Hardware's belt.

 Retractable Sword: The retractable sword consists of four magnetized blade segments of varying length. When a reverse magnetic charge is applied to the segments, magnetic repulsion pushes the segments from their housing. The sword's full length is 30 inches when extended. By altering the charge's polarity, the segments are retracted into their housing. The sword has double edges that are kept razor sharp by an automatic sharpening mechanism that edges the blades every time they retract.

 The sword is reinforced with a special sleeve composed of a variation of Hardware's shell alloy. As a result, the blade is highly flexible while retaining an extremely hard edge. Such qualities are necessary since the retractable sword would likely break due to the strain placed on it by Hardware's superhuman strength.

 PLASER: A large scale plasma delivery system that is easily the most devastating weapon in Hardware's arsenal. When activated, the Plaser creates a fist-sized globule of super-heated plasma that is trapped in a magnetic bottle and then propelled to its target via a high-intensity laser beam. Upon striking matter of sufficient density, the magnetic bottle ruptures and releases the plasma, which causes the target's temperature to increase by 10,000 degrees F in under 0.1 seconds. Most targets are effectively vaporized by the Plaser's blast.

 The Plaser's great destructive power comes with some drawbacks. It consumes an enormous amount of energy, requiring Hardware to use an external auxiliary power supply. The Plaser also can only fire three shots before its circuitry is fused by the extreme temperatures it produces. Naturally, Hardware has designed the weapon as well as its power supply to be disposable.

 The blast radius of the Plaser is uncontrolled, meaning that Hardware could be seriously injured or killed if he fires it at too close a target. Thus, DOBIE's tracking and targeting sub-system will not engage the Plaser against a target closer than 60 feet unless it receives Hardware's override command.

 Energy Field: Worn on his forearm, this device creates an energy barrier that protects Hardware from incoming fire.  The field can easily protect Hardware from armor-piercing bullets, energy blasts, and even small explosions at close range. Despite this, the field is not indestructible: sustained heavy weapons fire will cause the field to lose power and eventually collapse.

 Hardware can adjust the shape of the energy field depending on the amount of protection he requires. The default setting for the field is a triangular shape ("delta configuration").

 Fluid Gun: This weapon shoots streams of various liquids under high pressure to impair the movement of opponents. Originally a handheld weapon, Hardware has redesigned the fluid gun so it can be comfortably worn on his wrist.

 Typically, the gun is loaded with Hardware shell alloy in a fluid state. When polarized and applied to the ground, the liquid metal will adhere to and immobilize anyone who steps in it. The shell fluid can only be removed if it is depolarized with the proper electrical charge.

 Hardware has also loaded the fluid gun with a lubricant composed of tetrafluroethylene microspheres which are virtually frictionless. Hence, it is virtually impossible to get traction on a surface coated with this lubricant; even powerful speedsters like the Flash are vulnerable to this substance.

 Flow Gun (Hardware #29) – One of Hardware's unique weapons, this handgun is constructed by specially programmed nano-assemblers stored in the pods in his armor's shoulder pads. When activated, the nano-assemblers leave their pods, travel down Hardware's arm, and assemble the flow gun in his hand. This process occurs so quickly that the nano-assemblers look like silvery liquid flowing down his arm, hence the name of the weapon. Hardware loads the flow gun with non-lethal ammunition like stun pellets.
 Holographic Projection System: This device projects convincing holographic copies of Hardware that he can use to distract or confuse opponents. He can also reconfigure the holographic system to project DOBIE's computer displays.
 
Other weapons Hardware uses less frequently include tasers, timed explosives, shoulder-mounted tranquilizer dart launchers, a liquid oxygen-fueled flamethrower, a micro-rocket (a small rocket that attaches to an opponent's back and then launches him helplessly into the air), a remote-controlled thruster unit (a miniature jet thruster that latches onto a fleeing vehicle and causes it to spin wildly out of control), a rocket pistol, a kusarigama, a high-powered laser pen (that temporarily blinds opponents), a neural net cannon (that produce effects like the omnicannon's neural net shells), a machine gun that fires explosive bullets, a "nova burst" (an extremely powerful directed energy weapon), a heavily armed Hardware robot (that Curtis could control from miles away via a telepresense rig),  a power source shield (that protects his armor from energy-draining weaponry), and a field of supercool atoms that can trap and immobilize energy beings like Doctor Light.

Transportation
 Skylark: A modified Moller M400 Skycar that can fly at speeds in excess of 400 mph thanks to a trio of rear-mounted 2500 horsepower Pratt & Whitney turbofan engines. Stability for the Skylark is provided by a pair of side-mounted 1200 horsepower Pratt & Whitney engines, which also granted it VTOL (Vertical Take Off and Landing) capabilities. Hence, the Skylark can hover in the air or take off straight up like a helicopter.

The Skylark's cockpit boasts state-of-the-art computer systems for surveillance. The craft can receive and monitor police-band, shortwave, AM, FM, TV, and CB signals. The Skylark is linked to Hardware's armor, enabling him to remotely control its systems. He often uses this link to activate the Skylark's autopilot when he needs quick extraction from dangerous situations.

The Skylark's chassis is manufactured from a special epoxy resin composite, making it light enough to be lifted by a normal man. Despite its low weight, this composite is highly bullet-resistant; the Skylark’s windows are similarly bulletproof. The craft's armor is augmented by its self-repair systems that uses nano-robots to fix any damage suffered during battle. If the Skylark is too heavily damaged, Hardware can bail out using the ejector seat.

Another benefit of the Skylark's mostly non-metallic construction is its virtual invisibility to conventional radar. Furthermore, the Skylark has an active counter-radar matrix that absorbs and broadcast false signals, causing more sophisticated radar systems to mistake the craft for anything from a bird to a civilian or military jet. These features along with its special noise suppression technology enable the Skylark to remain in place unseen and unheard for hours. Curtis later equipped the Skylark with cloaking technology that makes the craft as invisible to the naked eye as to electronic detection.

Though designed to avoid enemies, the Skylark is well prepared for battle. The craft has a pair of spindles under its fuselage on which Hardware can mount multiple weapons packages. For defense, the Skylark has chaff and flare dispensers to counter radar-seeking and heat-seeking missiles, respectively.

Hardware sometimes uses a larger version of the Skylark called the Skytank. As implied by its name, the Skytank possessed heavier armor to withstand more punishment. Because of its greater weight, the Skytank has six side-mounted 1200 horsepower Pratt & Whitney engines to provide stability and VTOL capabilities. If the Skytank is severely damaged in battle, the craft has an ejector seat that converts into a metal hang glider (a "soft landing module"). Despite these differences, the Skytank shares many of the features of the standard Skylark.

Jet-Pack (formerly): A personal short-range propulsion rig with turbine thrusters that gather the surrounding air, then expel it in a continuous stream. The original jet pack was designed for his Version 1.0 armor and was controlled via the suit's on-board computer ("Obie"). Because of the heat and thrust generated, Hardware had to replace most of the rig every three uses, allowing him to regularly experiment with new designs. He often used such experimentation to improve the Jet-Pack's fuel efficiency when used at maximum thrust. As a result, he eventually increased its maximum flight time from over 3 minutes to several minutes.

The second Jet-Pack was designed for the Version 2.0 armor and was controlled via DOBIE.  Built with the full cooperation and resources of Alva Technologies, this rig was much sturdier and more dependable, enabling him to use it almost indefinitely with regular maintenance. At maximum thrust, the Version 2.0 Jet Pack had enough fuel to keep Hardware airborne for 20 minutes. Hardware increased the rig's flight time to over an hour by adding insulation made of "smart ceramic" developed by Hard Company.

Afrofuturism
Hardware can be included in the discourse of Afrofuturism based on its adherence to Mark Dery's definition of "speculative fiction that treats African-American themes and addresses African-American concerns in the context of 20th century technoculture—and, more generally, African-American signification that appropriates images of technology and a prosthetically enhanced future".

Curtis Metcalf re-purposes technology as a force of liberation, fighting against the evil Edwin Alva. As Hardware, he uses his superhuman understanding and fluency with technology as a form of agency. Hardware's status as a superhero, through the manipulation of technology, is a means of transcending the digital divide.

In other media
 Hardware makes a cameo appearance in issue #7 the Superman & Batman Magazine.
 Hardware makes non-speaking appearances in Young Justice: Outsiders. This version is initially a member of the Justice League before joining Batman, among other Leaguers, in resigning due to U.N. secretary-general Lex Luthor's restrictions preventing the League from interfering in metahuman trafficking rings.

References

Characters created by Dwayne McDuffie
Comics characters introduced in 1993
DC Comics male superheroes
DC Comics scientists
Milestone Comics titles
African-American superheroes
Fictional inventors
Black people in comics
DC Comics American superheroes
Steel (John Henry Irons)